The 1898 European Rowing Championships were rowing championships held on the river Po in the Italian city of Turin on a day in mid-August. The competition was for men only and they competed in five boat classes (M1x, M2x, M2+, M4+, M8+); it was the first year that the double scull event formed part of the competition.

Medal summary

Footnotes

References

European Rowing Championships
European Rowing Championships
Rowing
Rowing
European Rowing Championships
Rowing competitions in Italy
Sports competitions in Turin